10-epi-γ-Eudesmol synthase (EC 4.2.3.84) is an enzyme with systematic name (2E,6E)-farnesyl-diphosphate diphosphate-lyase (10-epi-γ-eudesmol-forming). This enzyme catalyses the following chemical reaction:

 (2E,6E)-farnesyl diphosphate + H2O  10-epi-γ-eudesmol + diphosphate

The recombinant enzyme from ginger (Zingiber zerumbet) forms β-eudesmol, 10-epi-γ-eudesmol, α-eudesmol and aristolene.

References

External links 
 

EC 4.2.3